Vladimir Viktorovich Shipilov (born 5 December 1972) is a former Russian professional footballer.

Club career
He made his Russian Football National League debut for FC Druzhba Maykop on 28 April 1992 in a game against FC Asmaral Kislovodsk.

He played 3 games in the 2004–05 UEFA Cup qualification rounds for FC Terek Grozny.

Honours
 Russian Cup winner: 2004.

External links
 

1972 births
People from Tikhoretsk
Living people
Soviet footballers
Association football midfielders
Russian footballers
Russian expatriate footballers
Expatriate footballers in Kazakhstan
FC Dynamo Stavropol players
FC Kuban Krasnodar players
FC Akhmat Grozny players
FC Chernomorets Novorossiysk players
FC Sokol Saratov players
FC Volgar Astrakhan players
FC Arsenal Tula players
FC Kristall Smolensk players
Russian expatriate sportspeople in Kazakhstan
Kazakhstan Premier League players
Sportspeople from Krasnodar Krai